Thomas Norman Kindness (August 26, 1929January 8, 2004) was an American politician who served as a member of the United States House of Representatives representing Ohio from January 3, 1975 to January 3, 1987.

Life and career
Born in Knoxville, Tennessee, Kindness graduated from Glendale High School in Glendale, California, in 1947.  Kindness received his bachelor of arts degree from the University of Maryland in 1951 and his bachelor of laws degree from George Washington University in 1953.  While a student at Maryland, Kindness became a member of the Alpha Tau Omega fraternity.

He was assistant counsel for paper company Champion International, in Hamilton, Ohio, from 1957 to 1973, and was elected to the city council of Hamilton in 1964, serving until 1969. He served as mayor of Hamilton from 1964 to 1967. He served in the Ohio House of Representatives from 1971 to 1974, when he was elected to Congress from Ohio's eighth congressional district, defeating Democrat T. Edward Strinko.

Kindness was re-elected five times: defeating Democrats John W. Griffin in 1976, Luella R. Schroeder in 1978, John W. Griffin again in 1980 and 1982, and John T. Francis in 1984.

In 1986, Kindness was one of the House impeachment managers who prosecuted the case in the impeachment trial of Judge Harry E. Claiborne. Claiborne was found guilty by the United States Senate and removed from his federal judgeship.

In 1986, Kindness won the Republican nomination for the U.S. Senate, but he lost to incumbent John Glenn. After this loss, Kindness stayed in Washington, D.C., and worked as a lobbyist. When Donald "Buz" Lukens, who had replaced Kindness as the 8th district's representative, was caught in a sex scandal in 1989, Kindness attempted to win his old seat, opposing Lukens in the 1990 Republican primary.

He entered a Republican primary battle that included Lukens, state Representative John Boehner (who would later be elected to the seat and become House Speaker during his tenure in Congress) and lesser-known candidates.

Early polls gave Kindness a 60-point lead over the relatively obscure Boehner. But Boehner attacked Kindness's ethics, citing Kindness's votes for congressional pay raises and against limits on fees for speeches by congressmen. Boehner also depicted Kindness as a carpetbagger who had abandoned his district for Washington. Despite Kindness's outspending him 5-1, Boehner won the nomination with 49 percent of the vote. Kindness finished with 32 percent and Lukens with 17 percent.

Kindness died in Exeter, Devonshire, England at the age of 74.

See also

 List of United States representatives from Ohio

References

 Rebecca Goodman.  "Thomas Kindness, 74, was lawmaker in D.C., Hamilton".  The Cincinnati Enquirer.  January 14, 2004
 "Thomas Kindness, former local, state and federal representative".  Cincinnati Post. January 13, 2004.

External links
 

1929 births
2004 deaths
20th-century American lawyers
20th-century American politicians
American lobbyists
George Washington University Law School alumni
Glendale High School (Glendale, California) alumni
Mayors of places in Ohio
Republican Party members of the Ohio House of Representatives
Ohio city council members
Politicians from Hamilton, Ohio
Politicians from Knoxville, Tennessee
University of Maryland, College Park alumni
Washington, D.C., Republicans
Republican Party members of the United States House of Representatives from Ohio